Yohanis Nabar (born 14 September 1992), better known as Anis Nabar, is an Indonesian professional footballer who plays as a winger for Liga 2 club Persipura Jayapura.

Career

PSMS Medan
He was signed for PSMS Medan to play in Liga 2 in the 2020 season. This season was suspended on 27 March 2020 due to the COVID-19 pandemic. The season was abandoned and was declared void on 20 January 2021.

References

External links 
Yohanis Nabar at Soccerway
Yohanis Nabar at Liga Indonesia

1992 births
Living people
People from Jayapura
Indonesian footballers
Papuan sportspeople
Association football wingers
Liga 1 (Indonesia) players
Persidafon Dafonsoro players
Sriwijaya F.C. players
Perseru Serui players
Persela Lamongan players
PSMS Medan players
Sportspeople from Papua